Mario Gianni (19 November 1902 – July 1967) was an Italian professional football player and coach, who played as a goalkeeper. He was nicknamed Gatto Magico (Magic Cat) for his acrobatic skill.

Career
Gianni played most of his career with Bologna, where he won three Italian Championships in 1924–25, 1928–29, 1935–36.

Gianni appeared for the Italy national football team on six occasions between 1927 and 1933, also captaining the team once.
He played the very last match of the 1931-32 campaign, as Gianpiero Combi was unavailable. Earning a Silver medal, with his national team.

Honours

Player
Bologna
Italian Championship: 1924–25, 1928–29, 1935–36
Mitropa Cup: 1932, 1934

International 
Italy
 Central European International Cup: Runner-up: 1931-32

Coach
Molinella 
Serie C: 1938–39
Carrarese
Serie C: 1942–43

References

1902 births
1967 deaths
Italian footballers
Italy international footballers
Pisa S.C. players
Bologna F.C. 1909 players
Association football goalkeepers